Rathafandhoo (Dhivehi: ރަތަފަންދޫ) is an inhabited island of the Gaafu Dhaalu Atoll, Maldives.

Geography
The island is located on the southwest side of South Huvadhu Atoll.

Climate
The climate is warm and the weather is tropical year round. The temperature averages 25° to 32 °C. Monsoon runs from May to November. The islands are closely situated to the Indian coast, are strongly affected by mainland Asian weather patterns, though do not experience serious monsoons.

Demography

Governance

Police
In late 2008, the Maldives Police Service opened a station on the island, with three police personnel.

Education 
Primary and secondary education on the island is provided by Rathafandhoo School, with 155 students and 21 teachers. Pre-schools are available.

Healthcare 
The Health Centre provides basic health care to the islanders for minor injuries, cuts, common colds and flu. If a serious health issue arises, islanders must go to the regional hospital located in the atoll capital Thinadhoo. The journey takes about 45 minutes via speed boat.

Economy 
The most common sources of paid work for residents include mat weaving, agriculture, reef fishing and carpentry and fishing for sea cucumbers, tuna and reef fish.

The islanders are famous for handicrafts and making nets (kunaa), made from a local plant called Hau. Some islanders weave mats, as souvenirs for visitors.

Sea cucumber fishery 

One of the main economic activities on the island is the sea cucumber fishery. The island is the collection center and major base for sea cucumber fisherman who fish in the southern part of the Maldives (Huvadhoo, Fuvahmulah and Addu city.) More than 10 registered companies carry out collecting, cooking, and drying the sea cucumbers for export to China.

NGOs

Several non-governmental organizations are registered on the island, including some inactive ones, such as RASFARI and READY (Rathafandhoo Eminent Association of Dynamic Youth).

References

External links 
 World Travel Guide Article

Islands of the Maldives
Populated places in the Maldives